Kerikeri Inlet is a settlement on the south side of the inlet of the same name in the Far North District of New Zealand. It is 10 km west of Kerikeri by road.

A private developer built a boat ramp and jetty at Windsor Point around 2000, but subsequently abandoned them. The ramp was bought by the Far North District Council, but the only land access was across private property. In 2019 work started to create a sealed access road and car park. Opposition to the development led to a four-day occupation of the land followed by a rāhui placed by Te Uri Taniwha against further construction or dredging. The dispute was resolved in late 2020 and the new facilities were complete in May 2021.

Demographics
Statistics New Zealand describes Kerikeri Inlet as a rural settlement. The settlement is part of the larger Puketona-Waitangi statistical area.

Kerikeri Inlet had a population of 447 at the 2018 New Zealand census, an increase of 57 people (14.6%) since the 2013 census, and an increase of 84 people (23.1%) since the 2006 census. There were 171 households, comprising 234 males and 210 females, giving a sex ratio of 1.11 males per female, with 66 people (14.8%) aged under 15 years, 48 (10.7%) aged 15 to 29, 198 (44.3%) aged 30 to 64, and 135 (30.2%) aged 65 or older.

Ethnicities were 92.6% European/Pākehā, 18.1% Māori, 2.0% Pacific peoples, and 2.0% Asian. People may identify with more than one ethnicity.

Although some people chose not to answer the census's question about religious affiliation, 62.4% had no religion, 25.5% were Christian, 1.3% had Māori religious beliefs, 0.7% were Buddhist and 2.0% had other religions.

Of those at least 15 years old, 75 (19.7%) people had a bachelor's or higher degree, and 54 (14.2%) people had no formal qualifications. 66 people (17.3%) earned over $70,000 compared to 17.2% nationally. The employment status of those at least 15 was that 150 (39.4%) people were employed full-time, 60 (15.7%) were part-time, and 6 (1.6%) were unemployed.

References

Far North District
Populated places in the Northland Region